Silent Retreat is an upcoming American romantic comedy film directed by Todd Strauss-Schulson.  It will star Isabella Rossellini, Dennis Haysbert, and Jack Whitehall.

Cast
Isabella Rossellini as Michelle Keaton
Dennis Haysbert as Josh Alpert
Jack Whitehall as Thomas
Larry Owens as Eric
 Sarah Goldberg as Gillian
 Lorraine Toussaint as Wanda

Production
Filming began in Troy, New York on August 30, 2019.  Filming also occurred in Kingston, New York in September 2019.  In January 2020, it was announced that Rossellini had completed her scenes in the film.

References

External links
 

American romantic comedy films
Upcoming films
Films directed by Todd Strauss-Schulson
Films shot in New York (state)
Miramax films
Upcoming English-language films